The Second Follett Ministry was the third ministry of the Government of the Australian Capital Territory, and was led by Labor Chief Minister Rosemary Follett and her deputy, Wayne Berry. It was sworn in on 18 June 1991, after a successful resolution of no confidence in the Trevor Kaine led Liberal Party was passed in the Australian Capital Territory Legislative Assembly. Following the 1989 ACT general election, Labor, with a plurality of seats, led a minority government following the failure of an Alliance government between the Liberals and Residents Rally.

This ministry covers the period from 18 June 1991 (when the Ministry was sworn in) until the 1992 ACT general election. There was one minor change during this period when, on 20 December 1991, a new ministry for industrial relations was created with Berry as minister and the ministries of education and arts divided into separate ministries, with Woods remaining as minister.

Paul Whalan, Follett's Deputy in the First Follett Ministry resigned from the Assembly on 30 April 1990 and was replaced by Terry Connolly who stepped straight into the ministry.

References

Australian Capital Territory ministries
Australian Labor Party ministries in the Australian Capital Territory